Haze is a 2010 Turkish drama film, directed by Tayfun Pirselimoğlu, starring Ruhi Sarı as a withdrawn young man who gets caught up with a shadowy criminal plot.

Plot
Reşat, a withdrawn and asocial young man who works at a pirate DVD shop, represses his feelings for the girl next door, and adds excitement to his life with petty theft. The film turns into a thriller when the shadowy Celal, a friend of Reşat's boss, gets shot just after he leaves a package in the shop and Reşat has to make sense of the photo and the gun it contains.

Review
Hürriyet Daily News reviewer Emrah Güler describes the film as, "a story of people living on the edge," and recommends it to those, "who have enjoyed director and writer Pirselimoğlu’s human stories both on screen and in published novels," but not to those, "wanting to see an uplifting and entertaining movie on the weekend."

See also
 2010 in film
 Turkish films of 2010

References

External links
 

2010 films
2010s Turkish-language films
2010 drama films
Films set in Turkey
Turkish drama films